Admiral Sir John Franklin Parry, KCB, FRGS (15 August 1863 – 21 April 1926) was a Royal Navy officer. He was Hydrographer of the Navy from 1914 to 1919.

Parry was the son of the Rt Rev Edward Parry, Bishop of Dover, and the grandson of the Arctic explorer Sir William Edward Parry, who was Hydrographer of the Navy from 1823 to 1829.

His nephew Admiral Sir William Edward Parry also achieved distinction in the Royal Navy.

References

External links 

 

1863 births
1926 deaths
Royal Navy admirals
Royal Navy admirals of World War I
Knights Commander of the Order of the Bath
Fellows of the Royal Geographical Society
Hydrographers of the Royal Navy